Kong Department is a department of Tchologo Region in Savanes District, Ivory Coast. In 2021, its population was 118,304 and its seat is the settlement of Kong. The sub-prefectures of the department are Bilimono, Kong, Nafana, and Sikolo. The eastern edge of the department extends into Comoé National Park.

History
Kong Department was created in 2012 by dividing Ferkessédougou Department.

Notes

Departments of Tchologo
States and territories established in 2012
2012 establishments in Ivory Coast